Castelloceras is an extinct genus of actively mobile carnivorous cephalopod of the family Baltoceratidae that lived in what would be Europe during the Ordovician from 468—443.7 mya, existing for approximately .

Taxonomy
Castelloceras was named by Evans (2005). Its type is Castelloceras arennigense. It was assigned to Baltoceratidae by Evans (2005).

Sources

 Fossils (Smithsonian Handbooks) by David Ward

Prehistoric cephalopod genera
Ordovician cephalopods
Darriwilian first appearances
Early Devonian genus extinctions
Prehistoric animals of Europe
Orthocerida